Diann Burns (born September 29, 1958 in Cleveland, Ohio) is a former television news anchor and a nine-time Emmy Award-winner.  She is best known for her years as a prime-time weekday anchor for two different Chicago television stations. She has also appeared in several major movies (see Film credits) and at least one television dramatic series (see Television credits). She is the first African-American woman to anchor the prime-time news in Chicago. She entered the Chicago TV market as a reporter after a successful career as newspaper journalist. She earned an advanced degree in journalism at Columbia University in New York.

Biography

Education
Burns earned an undergraduate degree in politics and mass communications from Cleveland State University and a master's degree from Columbia University Graduate School of Journalism in New York City.

Career
Burns began her career as a print journalist in Cleveland Ohio for The Plain Dealer in the late 1970s until 1980. At that time, she moved to New York and completed her master's degree in journalism at Columbia University in 1981. From 1981 until 1983, she was at WPIX. In 1983, she joined NBC-affiliated WCMH television as a general assignment reporter, where she was named news anchor in 1984. From 1985 until 2003, she was the 5pm and 10pm weekday news anchor at American Broadcasting Company (ABC) owned and operated WLS-TV Chicago, where she was Chicago's highest-paid television news professional before joining WBBM-TV in 2003 as the weekday 5pm, 6pm and 10pm news anchor, until leaving WBBM in 2008. WBBM is owned and operated by CBS (CBS Worldwide, Inc.). ABC is a division of The Walt Disney Company’s Disney-ABC Television Group.

Most dangerous live reports
  War-torn Somalia, where she was not embedded with US troops, but on her own.  No makeup, no lighting, no running water, no teleprompters.
  Reporting live just outside a mobile home rigged with enough explosives to destroy an entire neighborhood in Glenview, Cook County, Illinois—the bomb was part of a booby-trap left for rescuers and police responding to the body in a suicide.

Most Notable on-camera moments
  With Nelson Mandela during his first United States tour after his release after 27 years as a political prisoner under apartheid in South Africa.
  Questioning the man just arrested for (and later convicted of) murdering Michael Jordan's father.

Career timeline
1974-79: Cleveland State University, Cleveland, Ohio
1979–80: The Plain Dealer (newspaper) Cleveland, Ohio
1980-81: Columbia University Graduate School of Journalism, New York, NY
1981-84: WPIX Television, a Tribune company, New York, NY
1984-85: WCMH Television, an NBC affiliate, Columbus, Ohio
1985–2003: WLS Television, owned and operated by ABC, a Walt Disney Company, Chicago, Illinois
2003-08: WBBM Television, CBS-owned and operated, Chicago, Illinois
2008-2011: Next TV, Chicago Urban League, Chicago, Illinois
2011–present: Diann Burns Media, Los Angeles, California

Awards
Among Burns' many awards are nine Emmys - one national and eight regional.

Volunteer work and philanthropy
Burns and her charitable foundation awarded record scholarships for underprivileged students to go to college.
She is the spokesperson for Pediatric Aids Chicago. She also works with Girls in the Game, an organization that promotes fitness and health as a way to teach girls to persevere and gain confidence to careers.
Burns is active with the Ronald McDonald House, the Northern Illinois Chapter of the Multiple Sclerosis Society, and The Support Group, an organization that assists high school students with school work and home life by providing tutoring and social services.
She lends her time and talent to the benefit of numerous other causes, especially organizations that focus on children and education.

Family
Until recently, Burns and her now teen-aged son resided in Chicago's Lincoln Park, see: "Chicago TV Anchor Diann Burns sells her Lincoln Park Mansion for $4,525,000" - Curbed.com (paraphrased, see article).  There are unconfirmed reports (not confirmed by Burns herself) that she may be relocating to California for a career opportunity, as published in various media outlets.

Film credits
Burns appeared in several major motion pictures, playing herself, including:
Richie Rich 1994, starring Macaulay Culkin.
Primal Fear (film) 1996, starring Richard Gere.
The Negotiator 1998, starring Samuel L. Jackson.

Televisions credits
Burns is known to have appeared in at least one television dramatic role as someone other than herself:
Boss - 2011, episode 5, starring Kelsey Grammer, on Starz.

References

External links
 NEW YORK TIMES: Diann Burns Filmography
 OBAMA's Executive Sounding Board (BUSINESSWEEK Magazine and MSNBC News)
 Starz TV Appearance for Diann Burns on Kelsey Grammer's BOSS (YourEntertainment)
 Diann Burns Gets More Than $4.5 Million For Her Lincoln Park Mansion (paraphrased) Curbed.com
 EBONY Magazine: Diann Burns - High Profile Chicago Media... (via FindArticles.com)
 NBC 4 - NEW YORK - $4,825,000 for a Chicago TV Anchor's Lincoln Park Mansion
 PR NewsWire: Diann Burns Hosts Second Season of Urban League's NextTV
 EARLIER Real Estate Deal Nets Diann Burns Over $1 Million (paraphrased) - Chicago Tribune
 Official Website: Diann Burns Live!
 Facebook: Diann Burns - Verified
 Diann Burns Media Co. - Facebook - Verified
 Twitter: Diann Burns - Verified
 LinkedIn: Diann Burns, President Diann Burns Media Co. - Verified
 Diann Burns' Facebook #2
 CBS2 Chicago's 10pm ratings UP 22% since adding Diann Burns - HighBeam / Crain's Chicago Business (paraphrased)
 Chicago's 100 Most Influential Women - Crain's Chicago Business
 HistoryMakers - Biography: Diann Burns
 YAHOO! Filmography: Diann Burns
 2nd Emmy Award Winning Season of NextTV for Diann Burns - Target Market News
 TV Guide Biography: Diann Burns
 Diann Supports American Red Cross
 News Anchor To Host URBAN LEAGUE'S Next TV Series - Chicago Defender News Company
 YAHOO! News: More Than $4.5 Million for News Anchor Diann Burns (paraphrased)
 Fox Chicago Season #2 for Diann Burns - Hip Hop Press
 SOLD! - Chicago Real Estate News Flash - from ChicagoLand Real Estate Forum (paraphrased)
 NBC 5 Chicago: $4,825,000 for a Chicago TV Anchor's Lincoln Park Mansion
 Pediatric Aids Chicago Foundation Gains Support From Diann Burns

1958 births
Living people
Columbia University Graduate School of Journalism alumni
African-American journalists
African-American television personalities
Television personalities from Cleveland
Television anchors from Chicago
Journalists from Ohio
21st-century African-American people
20th-century African-American people